Charles Adrian Hobbs  (born January 1946, in Ilkley, West Yorkshire, UK) specialises in vehicle crashworthiness with a background in accident and injury investigation/analysis.

As an engineer and later as Honorary Chief Research Scientist, Hobbs was involved in the UK Government’s programme of Crash Injury Research for nearly 30 years. He undertook the research that helped lead to the mandatory wearing of the seat belt in the UK, the development of the Offset Deformable Frontal Barrier Crash Test and the establishment of the safety organisation Euro NCAP.  Hobbs was awarded a C.B.E. in 2008.

Hobbs has provided advice to the World Bank (1), the World Health Organization, the European Commission and Central European and North African countries on transport safety and the provision of emergency services (2-4).

Safety career
Hobbs joined the Transport Research Laboratory (TRL) in 1972 as a Scientific Officer. For two years he was involved in researching accident causation, investigating accidents alongside the police about the contributing factors to an accident. (5,6) In 1976 he reported on his analysis of brake defects and their contribution to accidents (7).

In 1974, he shifted his focus to car occupant injuries. He analysed and reported on the direct connection between the accident, resulting injuries, their causes and the effectiveness of safety features with medical data, car inspection and questionnaires. During this period he concluded that intrusion into the passenger compartment of the vehicle during a frontal impact accident played a very major role in causing injuries. (8-10)

As a result of this research, he realised how effective wearing a seat belt was in preventing serious injury to a vehicle’s occupant. In 1978, Adrian published a comprehensive study of the life-saving potential of seat belt wearing.(11-14) This study helped lead to the passing of the mandatory seat belt wearing legislation in the UK (Hansard), which came into force on 31 January 1983. (15)

Hobbs then switched his research focus to vehicle safety and, in 1985, he designed a demonstration Pedestrian Safety Car (based on a Mini Metro). (16-21), later modified to incorporate current thinking in Frontal and Side impact protection. (22,23) For side impact, conventional wisdom held that protection came from strengthening the side of the car and providing padding protection on the inside of the door. Hobbs expressed his concern that many manufacturers were simply fitting door beams, located where they could increase the risk of injury. (24-31) Hobbs's modifications did improve the car, but the car still did not provide good protection or meet the proposed side impact test requirements. Elsewhere in France, Germany, and the UK another vehicle was tested. Hobbs researched about this car, which although much weaker than the modified Metro, performed better. He discovered that a lighter door rather than a heavier door bounces off the impacting car and starts moving the occupant earlier, increasing the time the body has to absorb the impact, so reducing the severity of injuries. He also discovered that when the door is controlled to move in vertically, it spreads the load over the chest, abdomen and pelvis consequently avoiding its concentration on the vulnerable chest area, reducing the possibility of a fatal injury. The provision of padding, Hobbs also concluded, had to be very soft to help spread the load and cushion the impact. (32-35) These conclusions and research directly contributed to the development of the European Side Impact Directive.

In the early 1990s, Hobbs  identified the inadequacies in the current frontal crash test procedure and his research led to the development of the Offset Deformable Barrier (ODB) Frontal Impact Crash Test. (36-52). Hobbs's frontal ODB test was adopted, in Europe and elsewhere, for both legislation and consumer test programmes.

With this research under his belt, Hobbs took on the study of Compatibility, the science of how cars could work together to minimise injuries to the occupants of both vehicles. (53-57) Although the research identified what needed to be changed and an assessment procedure was developed, research funding dried up and government interest in further improving car crash safety was absent.

Europe
During the 1990s, Hobbs was an active member of the European Experimental Vehicles Committee (EEVC) in particular of the Frontal Impact and the Compatibility Working Groups, which he initiated. He also collaborated with other working groups to develop test procedures for side impact and pedestrian protection.

Hobbs  was asked by the European Transport Safety Council (ETSC) to present the case for the adoption of the EEVC Frontal and Side Impact test procedures for European Type Approval to the European Parliament in Strasbourg. The EEVC was proposing an initial crash test speed of 56 km/h (approx. 30 mph) rather than the 60 km/h already used in research crash tests. The intention was that the test speed would later be increased to 60 km/h. This was at a European Parliament Inter-group meeting, with Max Mosley of the Federation Internationale de L’Automobile (FIA) as chairman. Industry was there to oppose – their concern was that cars could not be built to withstand the speeds proposed. Yet Max Mosley, profoundly moved by the recent death of Ayrton Senna on the race track, developed an increased interest in reducing the road accident injury toll. The death of a racing driver had spurred on the cause to improve car safety for the public and to prevent millions of deaths on European roads.

A new consumer information programme
Meanwhile, back in the UK Hobbs had been working on a proposal for an independent crash test programme called UK NCAP. His proposal, presented in 1994, outlined to the UK department of Transport the concept of a consumer information programme based on the EEVC proposed frontal impact, side impact and pedestrian protection crash test procedures. His reason for a consumer-based information car-testing programme was clear. He cited the New Car Assessment Programme in the US that had had a more significant effect on changing car design than any US legislative test. He also cited the magazine Auto Motor und Sport and the ADAC, in Germany, whose published car crash tests results were already influencing how manufacturers designed their cars, as they endeavoured to obtain good ratings in the published tests.

The Department of Transport agreed to go ahead with the proposal and initiated the first phase of tests and assessments. (58-60) Following further discussions with the European Commission, in Brussels, (61,62) Hobbs mentioned the proposal to Max Mosley. Mosley was inspired to help and make Hobbs’s wish for a Europe wide consumer test programme a reality. Called initially the UK NCAP programme it later came to be branded, with the support of the FIA and other European players, as Euro NCAP.

"No politician would put in legislative standards that a manufacturer couldn’t meet. It was necessary to create a competitive market place for safety, which ensured that carmakers exceeded basic standards. It was imperative to empower the safety engineer in the heart of carmakers so that their managements made safety a priority"

EURO NCAP
Euro NCAP (the European New Car Assessment Programme) is now an established consumer-testing programme that assesses and publishes the safety of new cars and provides valuable safety information to consumers. Thousands of crash-tested cars later and the award of thousands of stars to industry, Euro NCAP has led to the establishment of other similar consumer programmes across the world and has contributed greatly to the safety of cars available on the European market.

Yet it all began with Hobbs’s persistence and a group of dedicated safety pioneers. The inaugural meeting of Euro NCAP was held in December 1996 with only a few members: the UK Department of Transport, the FIA, the Swedish National Road Association (SNRA) and International Testing.  The very first results of 7 crash-tested super-minis were released publicly to the media in early 1997, much to the consternation of industry. (63-67)

Hobbs was the first Chairman of the Technical Working Group and he later became Secretary General until his retirement in 2007.

Euro NCAP’s team of engineers and labs now carry out a frontal, side impact and pedestrian protection test as well as assessments on child protection and on the range of technologies existing within the car. Tests are carried out on all vehicles from super-minis to SUVs to the latest hybrids and petrol engines, resulting in a star rating with a maximum award of 5 stars. Special awards are also given to car makers with innovative technologies.

Safety achievements and developments in the industry, as a direct result of the work of Euro NCAP, have included the following:

For frontal impact protection: improved car structures limiting passenger compartment intrusion, so providing space for the restraints to operate without the occupants impacting the car’s interior, improved seat belts with pre-tensioners and load limiters, improved multi-stage frontal airbags, removal of hazards in the knee impact area and knee protecting air bags.

For side impact protection: improved car side structures with airbags to protect the head, chest, abdomen and pelvis, and pole impact protection.

Additional achievements have been: car fronts with improved pedestrian protection, improved child occupant protection, provision of effective reminders to wear seat belts, promotion and greater introduction of technologies such as electronic stability controls, autonomous emergency braking and lane departure warnings.

Personal life 
Hobbs continues to provide consultancy on road and vehicle safety issues and provides advice to the media. He is a motor sport enthusiast having been a rally driver in his youth. Since retirement, he has become involved in supporting a number of local and national organisations. Since 1974, he has been married to Jacqueline, a retired teacher with a keen focus on special needs. Their adopted son Philip died in 2002, aged 28. Adrian and Jackie live together in Berkshire.

References 

 Gerondeau, C et al, (1992) “Qualitative Analysis of the System to Campaign against Road Accidents,” World Bank - European Commission, New York and Brussels.
 Hobbs, C A et al, (1993), “Road Traffic Accidents in Morocco,” World Health Organization, Copenhagen.
 Steering Committee For Statistical Indicators For Accidents, (1985), “Information and Guidelines on the Use of The Basic Data Set on Accidents,” World Health Organization, Copenhagen.
 Steering Committee For Statistical Indicators For Accidents, (1987), “A Basic Data Set and Guidelines for Its Use,” World Health Organization, Copenhagen.
 Harvey, Chris, (28 July 1974) “Crash course to cut accidents,” Sunday Times, London.
 Spicer, Roy, (30 November 1975) “There’s a Boffin in Your Back Seat,” Sunday Mirror, London.
 Hobbs, C A, (1976) “Brake Defects in Cars,” Proceedings of the Institution of Mechanical Engineers Conference on “Braking of Road Vehicles,” Loughborough.
 Hobbs, C A, (1980), “Car Occupant Injury Patterns And Mechanisms,” Proceedings of the Eighth International Technical Conference on Experimental Safety Vehicles, Wolfsburg.
 Mills, P J, and C A Hobbs, (1984).”The Probability Of Injury To Car Occupants In Frontal And Side Impacts,” Proceedings of the 28th Stapp Car Crash Conference, Chicago.
 Hobbs, C A. (1991) “The Need For Improved Structural Integrity in Frontal Car Impacts,” Proceedings of Thirteenth International Technical Conference on Experimental Safety Vehicles, Paris.
 Hobbs, C A, (1978), “The Effectiveness of Seat Belts in Reducing Injuries to Car Occupants,” TRRL Laboratory Report 811, Crowthorne.
 Timberlake, Lloyd, (10 July 1978), “So fasten your seatbelts,” Jerusalem Post, Israel,.
 “Recent British study finds seatbelts cut injuries in half,” The Windsor Star, Ontario, (15 November 1978).
 Timberlake, Lloyd, (14 November 1978) “Seatbelts get more backing in new, rigorous British study,” Edmonton Journal, Alberta,.
 “Road Traffic (Seat Belts) Bill,” Weekly Hansard, Issue No. 1135 Pg 1793, House of Commons, London, (16 – 22 March 1979).
 Hobbs, C A et al, (1985), “PSC1 - A Demonstration Car with Improvements for Pedestrian Protection,”  Proceedings of the Tenth International Technical Conference on Experimental Safety Vehicles, Oxford.
 “Safety Metro unveiled,” Autocar, London, (10 July 1985).
 Rolfe, Allen, (October1985) “Safety Car,” Performance Car, London.
 “Crash,” (1989), Horizon - BBC Television, United Kingdom.
 “How Safe are our Children,” (1991), World in Action – Granada for Independent Television, United Kingdom.
 “Speed,” (2000), Panorama – BBC Television, United Kingdom.
 Hobbs, C A et al, (1997), “Progress Towards Improving Car Occupant Protection in Frontal Impacts,” Proceedings of the Eleventh International Technical Conference on Experimental Safety Vehicles, Washington.
 Hobbs, C A et al, (1987) “Development of the European Side Impact Test Procedure and Related Vehicle Improvements.” Proceedings of the Eleventh International Technical Conference on Experimental Safety Vehicles, Washington.
 “Trapped: can door beams kill?,” Top Gear, London, (October 1993).
 “Side impact bars don’t help says Renault safety chief,” The Sunday Times, London, (16 July 1994).
 Carter, Matthew, (23 July 1994), “The side-effects of trying to bar accidents,” The Weekend Telegraph, London.
 “Experts call for door beam rethink,” Complete Car, London, (August 1994).
 Oxford, Bob, (14 October 1994) “Row erupts over effectiveness of side impact bars,” Fleet News, Peterborough.
 Johnstone, Helen, (19 October 1994), “Side impact bars facing a broadside of criticism,” The Daily Telegraph - The Motor Show, London.
 “Lateral Thinking,” Complete Car, London, (December 1994).
 Hiday, Jeffrey, (12 February 1995), “Studies question side impact door beams,” The Providence Sunday Journal, Providence, Rhode Island.
 Hobbs, C A and M G Langdon. (1988), “Thoracic Impact and Injury in Side Impact Accidents,” Proceedings of the 1988 International Conference on The Biomechanics of Impacts, IRCOBI” Bergisch Gladbach.
 Hobbs, C A, (1989), “The Influence of Car Structures and Padding on Side Impact Injuries,” Proceedings of the Twelfth International Technical Conference on Experimental Safety Vehicles, Gothenburg.
 Hamer, Mike, (22 October 1987), “Euro Sid sets the standard on car safety,” New Scientist, London.
 Hobbs, C A, (1995), “Dispelling the Misconceptions about Side Impact Protection,” Advances in Occupant Protection Technologies for the Mid-Nineties (SP-1077) SAE International Congress and Exposition, Detroit.
 Hobbs, C A, (1990), “Essential Requirements for an Effective Full Scale Frontal Impact Test – SAE 900410. SAE International Congress and Exposition, Detroit.
 Hobbs, C A, (1992), “The Need for a Deformable Impact Test Surface for Frontal Impact Testing.” Proceedings of the Institution of Mechanical Engineers - Seminar on Frontal Impact Testing, London.
 Hobbs, C A, And D A Williams, (1994), “The Development of the Frontal Offset Deformable Barrier Test,” Proceedings of the Fourteenth International Technical Conference on the Enhanced Safety of Vehicles, Munich.
 Hobbs, C A, (1995), “The Rationale and Development of the Offset Deformable Frontal Impact Test Procedure,” Issues in Automotive Safety Technology: Offset Frontal Crashes, Airbags, and Belt Restraint Effectiveness (SP-1072), SAE International Congress and Exposition, Detroit.
 Baker, Alan, (June/July 1990) “Vehicle Safety ’90,” Automotive Engineer, The Institution of Mechanical Engineers, London.
 Steven, Catherine, (18 October 1991), “It’s no accident,” The Guardian, London.
 Shelley, Tom, (April 1993), “Real accidents make safer cars,” Eureka, Dartford.
 Baker, Alan, (June/July 1993). “Softer barriers for impact testing,” Automotive Engineer, The Institution of Mechanical Engineers, London.
 “Are we being sold a dummy?,” Complete Car, London, (November 1994).
 Thomas, James, (22 March 1995), “Car makers face crash test U-turn,” Autocar, London.
 Wolmar, Christian, (20 March 1995), “Motorists demand stricter car tests,” The Independent, London.
 Bailey, Eric, (25 March 1995), “EU car crash tests ‘are too easy to pass’,” The Daily Telegraph, London.
 Nelson, Chris, (9 June 1995), “Desktops will do fine if it comes to the crunch,” The Daily Telegraph, London.
 “Safety secrets: the hidden killer,” What Car?, London, (February 1996).
 “Have our Cars Really Become Safer,” (1 March 1993), Watchdog – BBC Television, United Kingdom.
 “The Driven Man – Rowan Atkinson,” (1990), Central Independent Television, United Kingdom.
 “J G Ballard – Crash,” (1991), Bookmark – BBC Television, United Kingdom.
 Hobbs, C A et al, (1996), “Compatibility of Cars in Frontal and Side Impact,” Proceedings of the Fifteenth International Technical Conference on the Enhanced Safety of Vehicles, Melbourne.
 Wykes, N J et al (1998) “Compatibility Requirements for Cars in Frontal and Side Impact,” Proceedings of the Sixteenth International Technical Conference on the Enhanced Safety of Vehicles, Windsor.
 Edwards, M et al, (2000), “Compatibility – The essential requirements for cars in frontal impact,” Vehicle Safety 2000 Conference, The Institution of Mechanical Engineers, London.
 Edwards, M et al, (2001), “The essential requirements for cars in frontal impact,” Proceedings of the Seventeenth International Technical Conference on the Enhanced Safety of Vehicles, Amsterdam.
 Bradsher, Keith, (24 September 1997), “A Deadly Highway Mismatch Ignored,” The New York Times.
 Hobbs, C A, (1996), “United Kingdom - New Car Assessment Programme (UK-NCAP),” Proceedings of the Fifteenth International Technical Conference on the Enhanced Safety of Vehicles, Melbourne.
 Hobbs, C A, and P J McDonough, (1998), “Development of the European New Car Assessment Programme (Euro NCAP),” Proceedings of the Sixteenth International Technical Conference on the Enhanced Safety of Vehicles, Windsor.
 “How Safe is Your Car,” (14 October 1997), First Edition – Carlton Television, United Kingdom.
 Eason, Kevin, (25 March 1995), “Safety ‘scandal’ puts hundreds of lives at risk,” The Times – Car 95, London.
 “Berger – Safety Campain” (sic), (25 March 1995), Eurosport News, Brussels.
 Murray, Bob, (8 February 1997), “The man who must carry on crashing,” The Daily Telegraph - Motoring, London.
 “Carmakers work to meet denounced test standard,” Professional Engineer, Institution of Mechanical Engineers, London, (12 February 1997).
 Evans, John, (12 February 1997), “Row erupts over NCAP testing,” Autocar, London.
 Weir, Andrew, (November 1998), “This Crash Could Save Your Life,” Reader’s Digest, London.
 Foley, Vivian, (1999), “Is Your Car Safe?,” Vision Publications, Cork, .
 “Safety Award for TRL,” (15 November 1986), Motor, London.
 “Awards for Engineering Excellence”, (1998), 16th International Technical Conference on the Enhanced Safety of Vehicles, Windsor.
 Baker, Alan, (February 1999), “King of Crashes,” Automotive Engineer, London.
 “2004 Bertil Aldman Award,” (2004), International Research Council on Biokinetics of Impacts, Graz.
 Bremner, Richard et al, (25 May 2004), “The Motor Industry’s 100 Most Influential Britons,: Autocar, London.
 “BusinessCar Power list 2007,” BusinessCar, Foots Cray, (5 September 2007).
 “Birthday Honours List – United Kingdom,” (13 June 2008), The London Gazette, London.
 “Honours,” (14 June 2008), The Times, London.
 “Adrian Hobbs – Mr Euro NCAP,” (Winter 2012), Advanced Driving - The Institute of Advanced Motorists, London.
 “Individual Achievement – Safety Awards 2013,” (30 May 2013), Global NCAP Annual Meeting, Seoul.

Other selected publications
 Hobbs, C A et al, “Classification of Injury Severity by Length of Stay in Hospital,” (1979), TRRL Laboratory Report 871, Crowthorne.
 Lowne, R W et al, (1979), “The Need for a Force Measuring Dummy in Side Impact Testing,” Proceedings of the Society of Automotive Engineers Passenger Car Meeting, Dearborn.
 Hobbs, Adrian, (2000), “Protecting People in Crashes- Making Cars Safer,” Best in Europe 2000 Road Safety Conference, European Transport Safety Council, Brussels.
 Hobbs, Adrian et al, (2001), “Priorities for EU Motor Vehicle Safety Design,” European Transport Safety Council, Brussels.
 Hobbs, C A, (2005), “Creating A Market For Safety – 10 Years of Euro NCAP,” The European New Car Assessment Programme, Brussels.

1946 births
Living people
Commanders of the Order of the British Empire
People from Ilkley
Safety engineering